This outline of open educational resources provides a way of navigating concepts and topics in relation to the open educational resources (OER) movement.

Definitions

Concepts of open 
 Gratis vs. libre
 Free cultural work and Free content
 Open content
 Openness
 Digital freedom
 Libre knowledge
 Open knowledge

Relationship to other educational concepts 
 Open education
 Adult Education
 Self-directed Learning
 Prior Learning Assessment (PLA/PLAR)
 Distance Education
 Online Education

Goals and aims 
 The Cape Town Open Education Declaration (2007)
 UNESCO 2012 Paris OER Declaration
 2009 Dakar Declaration on Open Educational Resources
 Berlin Declaration on Open Access to Knowledge in the Sciences and Humanities

How to design learning using OER
 Personal Growth
 Professional Development
 Formal Instructional Design

Tools

Access and delivery 
 Open access
 OpenCourseWare
 Distance learning
 Virtual learning environment
 Open format

Learning 
 Open educational resources (OER)
 Recursos educativos abiertos (OER in Spanish)
 OER Commons
 Connexions
 Open textbooks
 Open content
 MIT OpenCourseWare
 Open access journals
 Learning objects

Licensing 
 Creative Commons license
 Open Content License
 GNU Free Documentation License
 Copyleft

Methods/Philosophy 
 Open learning
 Open educational practices
 Connectivism
 Heutagogy
 Open supported learning
 Flexible learning
 E-learning theory

Types of learning experiences 
 MOOCs
 Personal learning environments
 Networked learning
 Blended learning
 Virtual learning environment
 Purpose-centered learning

Programs and initiatives 
 Athabasca University in Canada
 OER initiatives
 Open university 
 OER Foundation
 OER Universitas 
 OER Africa
 Khan Academy
 Open University in the United Kingdom
 The Saylor Foundation
 Wikibooks
 Wikiversity
 WikiEducator
 Open.Michigan
 Commonwealth of Learning
 Open Learning for Development

Governance, policies and standards 
 Open educational resources policy
 Open-door academic policy
 United Kingdom Accreditation Service
 2011 Commonwealth of Learning and UNESCO Guidelines on Open Educational Resources in Higher Education
 2011 Commonwealth of Learning and UNESCO A Basic Guide to Open Educational Resources

References

External links 

Open educational resources
Wikipedia outlines